Medicine Lake may refer to:

Places
 Medicine Lake Volcano in California, USA
 Medicine Lake, Minnesota
 Medicine Lake Regional Trail, a bicycle trail
 Medicine Lake, Montana

Lakes
 Medicine Lake (Alberta)
 Medicine Lake in Carbon County, Montana
 Medicine Lake in Granite County, Montana
 Medicine Lake in Sheridan County, Montana
 Medicine Lake (Minnesota), a lake near Minneapolis, Minnesota
 Medicine Lake (South Dakota)

See also 
 Medicine Grizzly Lake
 Medicine Owl Lake